16 Biggest Hits is a 2006 Charlie Daniels compilation album. It is part of a series of similar 16 Biggest Hits albums released by Legacy Recordings.

Track listing

Chart performance
16 Biggest Hits first reached #68 on the U.S. Billboard Top Country Albums chart in 2007. It later peaked at #12 following Daniels' passing.

References

Daniels, Charlie
Charlie Daniels compilation albums
2006 greatest hits albums